Angels & Devils is the second studio album by American country music artist Sarah Darling. It was released on February 15, 2011 by Black River Entertainment as the follow-up to Darling's 2009 debut album Every Monday Morning.

The album is split into two discs. The songs on the first follow the production style of modern country music whilst the songs on the second are more traditional and acoustical, including a new 'stripped-back' recording of "Stop the Bleeding" from Darling's first album. Also featured on the record are covers of Elton John's "Sorry Seems to Be the Hardest Word" and U2's "With or Without You", the latter of which was released as a digital single on August 31, 2010.

A music video for the lead single, "Something to Do With Your Hands", was released on February 14, 2011 and features TNA wrestler A.J. Styles. After its premiere on CMT.com, the video became the second most viewed music video on the site.

Track listing

Personnel

 Tim Akers – keyboards, piano
 David Angell – violin
 Monisa Angell – viola
 Jeff Armstrong – keyboards, piano 
 Carrie Bailey – violin 
 Mike Brignardello – bass guitar, finger snaps
 Pat Buchanan – electric guitar, finger snaps
 Tom Bukovac – electric guitar
 Gary Burnette – acoustic guitar, finger snaps
 John Catchings – cello
 Rob Cureton – bass guitar
 Eric Darken – percussion
 Sarah Darling – lead vocals, finger snaps
 David Davidson – violin 
 Steve Dorff – string arrangements 
 Conni Ellisor – violin 
 Chris Farrell – viola 
 Shawn Fichter – drums, finger snaps
 Paul Franklin – steel guitar
 Vince Gill – duet vocals on "Bad Habit"
 Carolyn Huebl – violin 
 David Hungate – bass guitar
 Tammy Rogers King – fiddle
 Anthony LaMarchina – cello 
 Doug Lancio – electric guitar
 Jerry McPherson – electric guitar
 Miles McPherson – drums 
 Jimmy Nichols – background vocals, keyboards, piano, finger snaps
 Mike Noble – acoustic guitar
 Mary Kathryn Van Osdale – violin 
 Carole Rabinowitz – cello 
 Danny Rader – acoustic guitar
 Sari Reist – cello 
 Adam Shoenfeld – electric guitar, keyboards
 Pamela Sixfin – violin 
 Biff Watson – acoustic guitar
 Karen Winklemann – violin 
 Glenn Worf – bass guitar
 Jonathan Yudkin – cello

References

2011 albums
Sarah Darling albums
Black River Entertainment albums